Symbolism of Christian saints has been used from the very beginnings of the religion. Each saint is said to have led an exemplary life and symbols have been used to tell these stories throughout the history of the Church. A number of Christian saints are traditionally represented by a symbol or iconic motif associated with their life, termed an attribute or emblem, in order to identify them. The study of these forms part of iconography in art history. They were particularly used so that the illiterate could recognize a scene, and to give each of the Saints something of a personality in art. They are often carried in the hand by the Saint.

Attributes often vary with either time or geography, especially between Eastern Christianity and the West. Orthodox images more often contained inscriptions with the names of saints, so the Eastern repertoire of attributes is generally smaller than the Western. Many of the most prominent saints, like Saint Peter and Saint John the Evangelist can also be recognised by a distinctive facial type. Some attributes are general, such as the martyr's palm. The use of a symbol in a work of art depicting a Saint reminds people who is being shown and of their story. The following is a list of some of these attributes.

Saints listed by name

Saints (A-H)

Saints (Q-Z)

I

J

K

L

M

N

O

P

Further reading

See also
 Christian symbolism
 Arma Christi
 Animals in Christian art
 Plants in Christian iconography
 Degrees of martyrdom

Notes

References

External links

Symbology I-P
Christian iconography
Religious symbols
Heraldic charges